Marmariskari Church is a church in the village of Marmariskari, Ochamchire municipality, Autonomous Republic of Abkhazia, Georgia. The church was built in the late Middle Ages. The church walls are in a heavy physical condition and need an urgent conservation.

External links 
Marmariskari Church Historical monuments of Abkhazia — Government of the Autonomous Republic of Abkhazia.

References 

Religious buildings and structures in Georgia (country)
Religious buildings and structures in Abkhazia
Churches in Abkhazia